Richard Greenberg (born February 22, 1958) is an American playwright and television writer known for his subversively humorous depictions of middle-class American life. He has had more than 25 plays premiere on and Off-Broadway in New York City and eight at the South Coast Repertory Theatre in Costa Mesa, California, including The Violet Hour, Everett Beekin, and Hurrah at Last.

Greenberg is perhaps best known for his 2003 Tony Award winning play, Take Me Out, about the conflicts that arise after a Major League Baseball player nonchalantly announces to the media that he is gay. The play premiered in London and ran in New York as the first collaboration between England's Donmar Warehouse and New York's Public Theater. After it transferred to Broadway in early 2003, Take Me Out won widespread critical acclaim for Greenberg and many prestigious awards.

Background and education
Greenberg grew up in East Meadow, New York, a middle-class Long Island town in Nassau County, east of New York City. His father, Leon Greenberg, was an executive for New York's Century Theaters movie chain, and his mother Shirley was a homemaker. Greenberg graduated from East Meadow High School in 1976 and went on to attend Princeton University, where he graduated magna cum laude with an A.B. in English. As part of his degree, Greenberg completed a 438-page senior thesis titled "A Romantic Career - A Novel". At Princeton, Greenberg studied creative writing under Joyce Carol Oates and roomed with future Harvard economics professor Greg Mankiw. Later he attended Harvard for graduate work in English and American literature, but dropped out of the program when he was accepted to the Yale School of Drama's playwriting program in 1985.

Career
Along with Take Me Out, Greenberg's plays include The Dazzle, The American Plan, Life Under Water, and The Author's Voice. His adaptation of August Strindberg's Dance of Death ran on Broadway in 2002, starring Ian McKellen, Helen Mirren, and David Strathairn.

He received the George Oppenheimer Award presented by Newsday in 1985 for The Bloodletters, produced off-off-Broadway while he was at Yale. In 1998 he was the first winner of the PEN/Laura Pels Theater Award for a playwright in mid-career.

In 2013, Greenberg worked on three shows: on Broadway, an adaptation of Breakfast at Tiffany's and The Assembled Parties, and the book for the musical Far From Heaven, which opened in June 2013 at Playwrights Horizons.

His play Our Mother's Brief Affair premiered at the South Coast Repertory Theatre in Costa Mesa in April 2009. Directed by Pam MacKinnon, the cast featured Jenny O'Hara, Matthew Arkin, Arye Gross and Marin Hinkle. This was a commission from the SCRT. The play opened on Broadway at the Samuel J. Friedman Theatre, produced by the Manhattan Theatre Club, on December 28, 2015 (previews), and officially on January 20, 2016, starring Linda Lavin.

His play The Babylon Line premiered Off-Broadway at Lincoln Center Theater's Mitzi E. Newhouse Theater on November 10, 2016, in previews, and officially on December 5. Directed by Terry Kinney, the cast features Josh Radnor as a writing teacher and Elizabeth Reaser as his student. The play was first performed at New York Stage and Film & Vassar College's Powerhouse Theater in June and July 2014, starring Radnor.

Style
The Methuen Drama Guide to Contemporary American Playwrights describes Greenberg's "most prominent" interest as history "and (also) the past". He has a strong "tendency to draw on historical characters or events——the Lost Generation, the Collyer Brothers, the New York Yankees" as sources for his material. He is said to have a "witty use of language."

Awards and nominations

 Tony Award, Best Play 
 The Assembled Parties, 2013 - nominee
 Take Me Out, 2003 - winner

 New York Drama Critics Circle Award, Best American Play
 Take Me Out, 2003
 Three Days of Rain, 1998 - Runner up

 Drama Desk Award, Outstanding Play

 The Assembled Parties, 2013 - nominee
 Take Me Out, 2003 - winner

 Lucille Lortel Award, Outstanding Play 
 Take Me Out, 2003 - winner
 The Dazzle, 2002 - nominee

 Drama League Award, Best Play, Take Me Out, 2003
 Outer Critics Circle Award
 The Dazzle, 2002 Outstanding Off-Broadway Play - winner
 John Gassner Award, The Dazzle, 2002 - nominee

 Oppenheimer Award, Best New Playwright (The Bloodletters, 1985)
 Molly Kazan Playwriting Award
 PEN/Laura Pels Theater Award for an American Playwright in Mid-Career (1998)
 Pulitzer Prize for Drama
 Three Days of Rain, 1998 - Finalist
 Take Me Out, 2003 - Finalist

Works

Theatre

 1984: The Bloodletters, Ensemble Studio Theatre, New York, NY, 1984.
 1985: Life Under Water, Marathon '85 Series. Ensemble Studio Theatre, New York, NY, 1985.
 1986: Vanishing Act, Marathon '86 Series. Ensemble Studio Theatre, New York, NY, 1986.
 1987: The Author's Voice & Imagining Brad, Greenwich House, New York, NY, 1999.
 1987: The Hunger Artist (based on stories and letters by Franz Kafka), St. Clement's, New York, NY
 1987: The Maderati, Playwrights Horizons, February 19, 1987.
 1987: Eastern Standard, John Golden Theatre, Broadway, January 5, 1989.
 1988: Neptune's Hips, Marathon '88 Series. Ensemble Studio Theatre, New York, NY, 1988.
 1990: The American Plan, Manhattan Theatre Club. New York City Center-Stage I. December 4, 1990.
 1992: The Extra Man, Manhattan Theatre Club. New York City Center-Stage II. April 28, 1992.
 1992: Jenny Keeps Talking, Manhattan Theatre Club. New York City Center-Stage II, New York, NY. March 22, 1993.
 1992: Pal Joey (based on the musical by John O'Hara, revised book), Huntington Theatre Company, Boston, MA, 1992-1993.
 1994: Night And Her Stars, Manhattan Theatre Club. New York City Center-Stage II, March 29, 1995; South Coast Repertory, March 1994
 1998: Three Days of Rain, Manhattan Theatre Club. New York City Center-Stage II, November 12, 1997.
 1998: Hurrah at Last, Roundabout Theatre Company. Gramercy Theater, New York, NY, June 3, 1999.

 2000: Everett Beekin, Lincoln Center, Mitzi E. Newhouse Theater, November 14, 2001 South Coast Repertory, September 2000<ref>Oxman, Steve. "Review. Everett Beekin Variety, September 20, 2000</ref>
 2001: The Dance of Death, BroadwaySimonson, Robert. Death, Where Is Thy Closing? Jan. 13, McKellen and Mirren Dance Away" playbill.com, January 13, 2002
 2002: The Dazzle, Gramercy Theater, New York, NY, March 5, 2002.
 2002: Take Me Out, Joseph Papp Public Theater, New York, NY, September 5, 2002.
 2003: The Violet Hour, Steppenwolf Theater Company, Chicago, IL, 2003; Manhattan Theatre Club. Biltmore Theatre, New York, NY, 2003.
 2005: A Naked Girl on the Appian Way 2006: Bal Masque, Theatre J, Washington, D.C.
 2006: The Well-Appointed Room, Steppenwolf Theater Company, ChicagoColumbus,Curt; Murray, Thomas; Nedved, William.  "Richard Greenberg: The Mind Lighting 'The Well-Appointed Room'" steppenwolf.org, 2005-2006, Vol. 2
 2006: The House in Town, Lincoln Center, Mitzi E. Newhouse Theater
 2008: The Injured Party, South Coast Repertory Theater, Costa Mesa, CA.
 2009: The American Plan, revival, Broadway
 2009: Our Mother's Brief Affair, South Coast Repertory Theater, Costa Mesa, CA.
2013: Breakfast at Tiffany's, Broadway, Cort Theatre
 2013: The Assembled Parties, Broadway, Manhattan Theatre Club
 2015: Our Mother's Brief Affair, Broadway, Manhattan Theatre Club
 2016: The Babylon Line, Off-Broadway, Lincoln Center
 2022: Take Me Out, revival, Broadway, 2nd Stage Theater

Television
 1989: "Ask Me Again" (based on "An Old-Fashioned Story" by Laurie Colwin), American Playhouse, PBS.
 1989: "Life under Water" (based on his one-act play), PBS.
 1989: "The Sad Professor," Trying Times, PBS.
 1990: "The Sacrifice," Tales from the Crypt. 1991: "Georgie through the Looking Glass," Sisters, NBC.
 1999: "The Time the Millennium Approached," Time of Your Life, Fox.

See also
 LGBT culture in New York City
 List of LGBT people from New York City

References

External links
 Richard Greenberg - Downstage Center interview at American Theatre Wing
 Everett Beekin at South Coast Repertory
 Playbill.com on The Violet Hour
 The Old Globe, San Diego
 Culturevulture.net, review of Take Me Out''
 
 

1958 births
Living people
Princeton University alumni
Harvard Graduate School of Arts and Sciences alumni
20th-century American dramatists and playwrights
People from East Meadow, New York
Writers from New York (state)
Yale School of Drama alumni
LGBT Jews
East Meadow High School alumni